Leif Svensson (born July 8, 1951 in Härnösand, Sweden) is a retired Swedish ice hockey player who played two seasons with the Washington Capitals in the late 70s.

Svensson played with Nacka HK, Södertälje SK, and Djurgårdens IF in Sweden before being signed as a free agent by the Washington Capitals on June 10, 1978. He played on the Sweden men's national ice hockey team, winning a bronze medal at the 1979 World Ice Hockey Championships. After his stint with the Capitals, Svensson played two years with Djurgården before retiring in 1982.

Career statistics

References

External links

1951 births
Living people
Djurgårdens IF Hockey players
People from Härnösand
Södertälje SK players
Swedish ice hockey defencemen
Undrafted National Hockey League players
Washington Capitals players
Nacka HK players
Sportspeople from Västernorrland County